Khalid Mahmood (born 28 December 1941) is a Pakistani field hockey player. He was born in Punjab. He won a gold medal at the 1968 Summer Olympics in Mexico City, and a silver medal at the 1964 Summer Olympics in Tokyo.

References

External links
 

1941 births
Living people
Pakistani male field hockey players
Olympic field hockey players of Pakistan
Olympic gold medalists for Pakistan
Olympic silver medalists for Pakistan
Olympic medalists in field hockey
Medalists at the 1964 Summer Olympics
Medalists at the 1968 Summer Olympics
Field hockey players at the 1964 Summer Olympics
Field hockey players at the 1968 Summer Olympics
Asian Games medalists in field hockey
Field hockey players at the 1966 Asian Games
Field hockey players at the 1970 Asian Games

Asian Games gold medalists for Pakistan
Asian Games silver medalists for Pakistan
Medalists at the 1966 Asian Games
Medalists at the 1970 Asian Games
20th-century Pakistani people